The 2022–23 Southern Miss Golden Eagles basketball team represented the University of Southern Mississippi during the 2022–23 NCAA Division I men's basketball season. The team was led by third-year head coach Jay Ladner, and played their home games at Reed Green Coliseum in Hattiesburg, Mississippi as first-year members of the Sun Belt Conference.

Previous season
The Golden Eagles finished the 2021–22 season 7–26, 1–17 in C-USA play last place in West Division. They defeated UTSA lost in the first round of the C-USA tournament before losing to Florida Atlantic in the second round.

On October 28, 2021, Southern Miss announced that this would be the last season for the team in the Conference USA and they would become a member of the Sun Belt Conference on July 1, 2022.

Offseason

Departures

Incoming transfers

2022 recruiting class
There were no incoming recruits for the class of 2022.

Preseason

Preseason Sun Belt Conference poll 
The Golden Eaglers were picked to finish in 13th place in the conference's preseason poll. Graduate forward Felipe Haase was named to the preseason All-SBC Second Team.

Roster

Schedule and results

|-
!colspan=12 style=| Exhibition

|-
!colspan=12 style=| Non-conference regular season

|-
!colspan=12 style=| Sun Belt Conference regular season

|-
!colspan=12 style=| Sun Belt tournament

|-
!colspan=9 style=| NIT

Source

See also
 2022–23 Southern Miss Lady Eagles basketball team

References

Southern Miss Golden Eagles basketball seasons
Southern Miss
Southern Miss basketball
Southern Miss basketball
Southern Miss